The ALDO Group  branded as ALDO, is a Canadian multinational corporation retailer that owns and operates a worldwide chain of shoe and accessories stores. The company was founded by Aldo Bensadoun in Montreal, Quebec, in 1972, where its corporate headquarters based in the Montreal borough of Saint-Laurent, Quebec remain today. It has grown to become a worldwide corporation, with nearly 3,000 stores across 100 countries, under three retail banners: ALDO, Call It Spring/Spring and GLOBO. Stores in Canada, the U.S., the U.K., and Ireland are owned by the Group, while international stores are franchised. The company once operated the now closed or rebranded banners Little Burgundy (which it sold to Genesco), Simard & Voyer, Christian Shoes, Access, Pegabo, Transit, Stoneridge, Locale, Feetfirst and FIRST (which was the American version of Feetfirst).

History
ALDO shoes were founded in Canada in 1972 as a footwear concession within Le Chateau. The original group included stores in Montreal, Ottawa, Quebec City, and Winnipeg. Aldo Bensadoun known today as a global shoe giant built his empire starting in Montreal. After four generations, the Bensadoun family continues into the shoe industry. "Mr. Bensadoun never intended to follow in the footsteps of his father, a shoe retailer in Morocco and France, or his grandfather, a cobbler in Algeria" (Strauss, 2010). Aldo Bensadoun learned Italian to better communicate with his suppliers in Italy, and eventually he cut out the middleman who serviced him between Canada and European manufacturers (Strauss, 2010). The first freestanding ALDO store was opened in Montreal, in 1978. The brand expanded in the 1980s and 1990s, with stores operating under the name ALDO across Canada. The first store outside of North America opened in Israel in 1995. The brand expanded in the 2000s into Saudi Arabia in 2001, England in 2002, and Singapore in 2003. Since then, the ALDO Group, with the ALDO and Call It Spring/Spring banners, has further expanded on the international market.

In 1991, the company launched the "Transit" banner in Canada, which later became "Spring" upon launching in the US. Five years later, they started the "Feetfirst" banner, which caters to an older clientele. Additionally the company operates "Globo Shoes" geared towards the family market. In 2010, the company once again began to evolve when it introduced, in Canada, a new store concept called "Lōcale", which will replace the current "Feetfirst" stores. "Lōcale" is a footwear and accessories boutique-style concept store aimed at young professionals; it offers a number of brand names. The company has also revived the Pegabo brand, which used to be its own chain of stores and is selling the brand in Feetfirst and Lōcale stores. In spring 2011, the Pegabo brand also launched at Hudson's Bay stores in Canada.

In 2010, the company made major announcements, which led to major expansion in the American market. The ALDO Group and JCPenney announced the launch of the Call It Spring brand, which would sell as a shop-in-shop concept in JCPenney stores across the United States. The Call It Spring concept was expected to be in 600 JCPenney stores by the fall of 2011 and JCPenney would be the only department store retailer of the brand. The ALDO Group also announced that it was partnering with Kohl's department stores to design and produce exclusive footwear products that would be sold under private and exclusive brand names. The new ALDO-designed products were to launch in Kohl's stores for the Spring 2011 season.

In 2017, Aldo Bensadoun's son David Bensadoun was appointed chief executive of Aldo, replacing Patrik Frisk.

On May 7, 2020, ALDO announced it would restructure under the Companies’ Creditors Arrangement Act citing the impact of the COVID-19 pandemic. All 6,680 store associates and more than half of the employees at its headquarters have been furloughed. In the midst of its restructuration, the company also move from its mythic headquarters to a nearby location in Saint-Laurent, Montreal. In July 2022, it announced that it had completed its restructuring process.

Criticism 
In December 2012, the U.S. Department of Labor found that a factory in Los Angeles producing ALDO goods was paying employees under minimum wage.

References

Canadian brands
1972 establishments in Quebec
Companies based in Montreal
Saint-Laurent, Quebec
Retail companies established in 1972
Privately held companies of Canada
Shoe companies of Canada
Canadian companies established in 1972
Footwear retailers
Companies that have filed for bankruptcy in Canada
Companies that filed for Chapter 11 bankruptcy in 2020